The first government of José María Aznar was formed on 6 May 1996, following the latter's election as Prime Minister of Spain by the Congress of Deputies on 4 May and his swearing-in on 5 May, as a result of the People's Party (PP) emerging as the largest parliamentary force at the 1996 Spanish general election.

The cabinet comprised members of the PP and a number of independents. It was automatically dismissed on 13 March 2000 as a consequence of the 2000 general election, but remained in acting capacity until the next government was sworn in.

Investiture

Cabinet changes
Aznar's first government saw a number of cabinet changes during its tenure:
On 16 July 1998, Josep Piqué was assigned the functions of Spokesperson of the Government after the resignation of Miguel Ángel Rodríguez as Secretary of State for Press on 10 July. The office had been vacant de jure since the new government was sworn into office in May 1996, but Rodríguez exercised as de facto spokesperson by attending press conferences held after the councils of ministers until his resignation and Piqué's subsequent appointment.
On 19 January 1999, following the nomination of Javier Arenas and Esperanza Aguirre to become new secretary-general of the People's Party (PP) and President of the Senate of Spain, respectively, a cabinet reshuffle ensued which saw Manuel Pimentel being named as new Minister of Labour and Social Affairs, whereas Mariano Rajoy replaced Aguirre in Education and Culture. Ángel Acebes was appointed to fill Rajoy's vacancy in the Public Administrations ministry.
On 30 April 1999, Jesús Posada replaced Loyola de Palacio in the Agriculture, Fisheries and Food portfolio after the latter was nominated on 22 April to run as the PP leading candidate in the 1999 European Parliament election.
On 21 February 2000, Manuel Pimentel resigned as Minister of Labour and Social Affairs as a result of a scandal involving irregularities conducted by one of his closest collaborators, Juan Aycart, leading Aznar to appoint Juan Carlos Aparicio as a replacement.

Council of Ministers
The Council of Ministers was structured into the offices for the prime minister, the two deputy prime ministers, 14 ministries and the post of the spokesperson of the Government.

Departmental structure
José María Aznar's first government was organised into several superior and governing units, whose number, powers and hierarchical structure varied depending on the ministerial department.

Unit/body rank
() Secretary of state
() Undersecretary
() Director-general
() Autonomous agency
() Military & intelligence agency

Notes

References

External links
Governments. Juan Carlos I (20.11.1975 ...). CCHS-CSIC (in Spanish).
Governments of Spain 1996–2004. Ministers of José María Aznar. Historia Electoral.com (in Spanish).
The governments of the first period of the People's Party (1996–2004). Lluís Belenes i Rodríguez History Page (in Spanish).

1996 establishments in Spain
2000 disestablishments in Spain
Cabinets established in 1996
Cabinets disestablished in 2000
Council of Ministers (Spain)